Luis Lanchero, also known as Luis Lancheros (?, Castile - 1562, Tunja, New Kingdom of Granada) was a Spanish conquistador and the founder of the town of Trinidad de los Muzos, Boyacá, the most important emerald settlement in Colombia. Muzo was founded after twenty years of unsuccessful attempts to subjugate the Muzo to Spanish rule. Lanchero arrived in the New World in 1533 and died impoverished in Tunja in 1562.

Biography

Early career

Luis Lanchero was born in Castile in a noble family. As a young man he was employed in the guard of Spanish king Carlos V, in which role he participated in the Sack of Rome in 1527. In 1533, searching for adventure, Lanchero left Europe for what would later become Venezuela with a conquest expedition led by Jerónimo Ortal.

American expeditions

Once there, Lanchero joined the expedition led by Nikolaus Federmann towards the Colombian Andes, reaching the newly founded capital of the New Kingdom of Granada in 1538. He became encomendero of Susa.

When in 1539 Hernán Pérez de Quesada took over the governance of Bogotá from his elder brother and founder Gonzalo Jiménez de Quesada he organised various expeditions in search of valuables and above all for El Dorado. While de Quesada was not satisfied with Lanchero, he was sent towards the territories of the Muzo in western Boyacá in the first months of 1540. Expeditions into Muzo territories were difficult because of the terrain. Due to a lack of food Lanchero's party had to slaughter some horses. After two unsuccessful attempts to subjugate the more than 10,000 Muzo, Lanchero marched through Panche territory to the south, the western portion of the current department of Cundinamarca, back towards Bogotá.

Founding of Muzo
In early 1559, fifteen years after the discovery of the rich emerald deposits by Diego Martínez, Lanchero returned to Muzo terrain and passed through Maripí. He founded Villa de la Santísima Trinidad de los Muzos, today known as Muzo, on February20, 1559. On this expedition, Lanchero was accompanied by conquistador Pedro de Ursúa. Muzo was first unsuccessfully founded as Tudela.

During the battles against the Muzo, Lanchero was wounded by an arrow in his chest. In 1560 Lanchero handed the governance of Muzo over to the encomenderos, leading to successive struggles over the rich emerald grounds. On October 17, 1560, Lanchero also passed the control of Curipí to the encomienda.

Later career
After Miguel Diez de Armendariz took control of the area, Lanchero lost all his possessions. Luis Lanchero died in poverty in Tunja in 1562, leaving a wife and one daughter.

Conquest by Luis Lanchero

Encomiendas

See also 

List of conquistadors in Colombia
Spanish conquest of the Muisca
Muzo people, Hernán Pérez de Quesada
Nikolaus Federmann

References

Bibliography

Further reading 
 

Year of birth unknown
1562 deaths
16th-century Spanish people
16th-century explorers
Spanish conquistadors
Encomenderos
History of Colombia